The 1991 PBA First Conference Finals was the best-of-7 basketball championship series of the 1991 PBA First Conference, and the conclusion of the conference's playoffs. Ginebra San Miguel and the Shell Rimula X played for the 48th championship contested by the league.

This series also serves as a rematch after Shell captured the championship in the same conference a year before when Ginebra (then known as the Añejo Rum 65ers) walked out of the playing court in the sixth and series-clinching game with Shell leading, 62-47 with 2:52 left in the second quarter.

Ginebra San Miguel won against Shell Rimula X in seven games to capture their third PBA title, coming from a 1-3 deficit. Ginebra's championship victory was the biggest PBA finals comeback in the league's history until the 2015–16 Philippine Cup Finals when the San Miguel Beermen came back from a 0–3 deficit to defeat the Alaska Aces and win the championship series.

Road to the finals

Shell finished the elimination round at first place, with an 8-3 record. However, they split their semifinals matches 4-4, ending up with a 12-7 card going into the finals.

Ginebra on the other hand barely made it to the semifinals, getting the fifth and last semis berth with a 5-6 eliminations win–loss record. In the semifinals, they lost their first match, but won their next seven games in succession to force a tie in first place and secured the other finals seat.

Series scoring summary

Games summary

Game 1

The tandem of Benjie Paras and Ronnie Magsanoc led Shell to their first victory of the series. Ginebra made a late game surge to reduce Shell's lead by two with almost two minutes left, but passing errors in the last minute of the game cost Ginebra the possible comeback.

Game 2

Ginebra was leading the game 90-79 at the start of the fourth quarter when Shell made a 13-2 run to tie the game at 92-all. After Rudy Distrito scored to restore Ginebra's lead, a layup of Bobby Parks and a three-point play by Ronnie Magsanoc gave Shell the lead with 6:40 left. Shell then pushed the lead further to five, 101-96, until playing coach Robert Jaworski scored 10 straight points in the final four minutes of the fourth quarter, forcing the game into overtime, 110-all.

In overtime, Jaworski continued his scoring run and gave Ronnie Magsanoc his sixth foul. Shell scored only five points in the extension period.

Game 3

Shell was leading the game entering the fourth quarter, 91-75. Robert Jaworski started the quarter orchestrating an 11-point run to put Ginebra within reach, 95-83. Jervis Cole took the game closer with a 10-4 run to bring back the Gins, 99-93. Dondon Ampalayo joined the surge, scoring five straight points, including a 20-foot three point shot. Chito Loyzaga made the crucial free throws to reduce Shell's lead by three, 103-100. Just as Ginebra is knocking on Shell's door, Ronnie Magsanoc scored eight straight points, dozing off a possible Ginebra comeback.

Game 4

Shell took over the game in overtime, with Ronnie Magsanoc scored a total of 28 points (14 came from the second half), including a back-to-back field goals, that sealed the victory for Shell with 49 seconds left. Meanwhile, Playing coach Robert Jaworski protested the game's officiating, with the pro-Ginebra crowd inside the ULTRA pelted the hardcourt with coins and other debris after the game.

Game 5

After the incident that occurred after game 4, PBA commissioner Rudy Salud requested for additional security from the ULTRA management and the Philippine National Police, to prevent any incident involving Ginebra and Shell supporters.

With Ginebra's back behind against the wall, they made a 32-0 run, from an 80-85 deficit, to pull away with the victory, denying Shell the series-clinching game and extending the series for another game. This currently stands as the most number of consecutive and unanswered points in a PBA game.

Game 6

Shell was leading the game most of the game, with leading as much as 14 points in the second quarter. Ginebra then came back with Jervis Cole, Chito Loyzaga and Philip Cezar leading the surge to reduce Shell's lead at the final quarter, 94-98. Bobby Parks tried to keep Shell's lead with a three-point play and giving them the lead, 111-106 with 5:04 left. But Ginebra made another run, this time was led by Rudy Distrito, who made six points, including two free throws that gave Ginebra the lead with 69 seconds left.

Game 7

With five seconds remaining in the game, Ginebra had the possession with both teams tied at 102-all. After Robert Jaworski signaled Rudy Distrito to drive into the painted area, he passed the ball to Distrito and made an off balance shot with Shell's Jojo Martin and Benjie Paras defending the basket. The shot went in and gave Ginebra a two-point lead, with one second remaining. Shell called a timeout to advance the ball at the half court. Ronnie Magsanoc tried a three-point attempt but was blocked by Jervis Cole.

Ginebra won the championship, making them the only team in PBA history to win a finals series coming from a 1-3 deficit.

Quotes from the Finals

Rosters

Broadcast notes

References

External links
PBA official website

1991 PBA season
1991
Shell Turbo Chargers games
Barangay Ginebra San Miguel games
PBA First Conference Finals